Kusalar may refer to:
 Kusalar, Owch Hacha, Ahar County, East Azerbaijan Province
 Kusalar, Qeshlaq, Ahar County, East Azerbaijan Province
 Kusalar, Khoda Afarin, East Azerbaijan Province
 Kusalar-e Olya, West Azerbaijan Province
 Kusalar-e Sofla, West Azerbaijan Province
 Kusalar, Zanjan